Hall Run is a  long 1st order tributary to Orrs Run in Ohio County, West Virginia.

Course 
Hall Run rises about 2 miles south-southeast of Valley Grove, West Virginia, and then flows southerly to join Orrs Run about 1.5 miles east-northeast of Camp Giscowhego.

Watershed 
Hall Run drains  of area, receives about 41.0 in/year of precipitation, has a wetness index of 310.68, and is about 44% forested.

See also 
 List of rivers of West Virginia

References 

Rivers of Ohio County, West Virginia
Rivers of West Virginia